Getting 'Em Right is a 1925 American silent action film, directed by Jack Harvey. It stars George Larkin, Jane Thomas, and Ollie Kirkby.

References

External links
Getting 'Em Right at the Internet Movie Database

1925 films
American silent feature films
1920s action adventure films
Films directed by Jack Harvey
American black-and-white films
American action adventure films
Rayart Pictures films
1920s American films
Silent action adventure films